AS-105 was the fifth and final orbital flight of a boilerplate Apollo spacecraft, and the third and final launch of a Pegasus micrometeroid detection satellite. It was launched by SA-10, the tenth and final Saturn I rocket, in 1965.

Overview 
AS-105 was an Apollo boilerplate spacecraft; boilerplate BP-9A was used for the flight. The spacecraft reentered on November 22, 1975. The Saturn launch vehicle (SA-10) was similar to those of missions AS-103 and AS-104.  As on the previous mission, the boilerplate service module was equipped with a test installation of a reaction control engine package.

The primary flight objective was to continue demonstration of the launch vehicle's iterative guidance mode and evaluation of system accuracy.

Launch 
AS-105 was launched from Cape Kennedy Launch Complex 37B at 08:00 EST (13:00 GMT) on July 30, 1965, on the last Saturn I rocket, SA-10. A planned thirty-minute hold ensured that launch time coincided with the opening of the Pegasus launch window. The launch was normal and the payload was inserted into orbit approximately 10.7 minutes after lift-off. The total mass placed in orbit, including the spacecraft, Pegasus spacecraft, adapter, instrument unit, and S-IV stage, was 34,438 pounds (15,621 kg).

The spacecraft was separated 812 seconds after lift-off and the separation and ejection system operated as planned. The Pegasus 3 spacecraft, which was attached to the S-IV stage of the Saturn I and stowed inside the boilerplate service module, was deployed 40 seconds after command initiation at 872 seconds. Pegasus 3 was a 1423.6 kilogram (3138.6 pound) micrometeoroid detection satellite, which was bolted to the S-IV.

References

External links

NSSDC: SA-10
Range safety data for Saturn SA-10
SA-10 flight mechanical summary technical memorandum, Jul. 13, 1965
Vibration and acoustic analyzes, Saturn SA-10 flight
Saturn SA-10/Pegasus C postflight trajectory

Apollo program
Spacecraft launched in 1965
1965 in the United States
Test spaceflights
Spacecraft launched by Saturn rockets